The 1958 Davis Cup was the 47th edition of the Davis Cup, the most important tournament between national teams in men's tennis. 24 teams entered the Europe Zone, 7 teams entered the America Zone, and 5 teams entered the Eastern Zone. Thailand made its first appearance in the competition.

The United States defeated Argentina in the America Zone final, the Philippines defeated Ceylon in the Eastern Zone final, and Italy defeated Great Britain in the Europe Zone final. In the Inter-Zonal Zone, Italy defeated the Philippines in the semifinal, and then the United States defeated Italy in the final. The United States then defeated the defending champions Australia in the Challenge Round. The final was played at the Milton Courts in Brisbane, Australia on 29–31 December.

The US team was composed of Alex Olmedo, Ham Richardson, Barry MacKay, and captain Perry T. Jones. Jack Kramer and Pancho Gonzales acted as advisors to Jones.

America Zone

Draw

Final
United States vs. Argentina

Eastern Zone

Draw

Final
Philippines vs. Ceylon

Europe Zone

Draw

Final
Italy vs. Great Britain

Inter-Zonal Zone

Draw

Semifinals
Philippines vs. Italy

Final
United States vs. Italy

Challenge Round
Australia vs. United States

References

External links
Davis Cup official website

 
Davis Cups by year
Davis Cup
Davis Cup
Davis Cup
Davis Cup
Davis Cup